Thomas Ashley may refer to:
Thomas L. Ashley (1923–2010), American politician
Tom Ashley (born 1984), New Zealand sailing champion
Thomas Ashley (professor) from Lady Margaret's Professor of Divinity
Clarence Ashley (1895–1967), also known as Tom Clarence Ashley, American musician and singer